The epitympanic recess is a hollow located on the superior/roof aspect of the middle ear.

Clinical significance
This recess is a possible route of spread of infection to the mastoid air cells located in the mastoid process of the temporal bone of the skull. Inflammation which has spread to the mastoid air cells is very difficult to drain and causes considerable pain. Before the advent of antibiotics it could only be drained by drilling a hole in the mastoid bone, a process known as mastoidectomy.

References 

Foramina of the skull